The 4th Army was a field army of the Czechoslovak People's Army, active from 1958 to 1965 and 1969–1991. In its second formation its headquarters was in Pisek.

The army was first formed from the 4th Rifle Corps on 15 July 1958.

In the 1980s the force included the 2nd Motor Rifle Division, 15th Motor Rifle Division, 4th Tank Division and 9th Tank Division, as well as other subordinate units including 321st Army Missile Brigade.

Structure 

 4th Army in Písek:
 4th Headquarters Battalion in Písek
 3rd Motor Rifle Division in Kroměříž (in case of full mobilization would have also formed the 26th Motor Rifle Division)
 33rd Tank Regiment in Přáslavice
 4th Motor Rifle Regiment in Hodonín with OT-64 wheeled armored transports vehicles
 5th Motor Rifle Regiment in Mikulov with BVP-1 tracked infantry fighting vehicles
 6th Motor Rifle Regiment in Uherské Hradiště with OT-64 wheeled armored transports vehicles
 361st Artillery Regiment in Hranice
 14th Separate Rocket Launcher Division in Přáslavice with 9K52 Luna-M artillery rocket systems
 3rd Command and Artillery Reconnaissance Battery in Kroměříž
 13th Anti-Aircraft Regiment in Bzenec 
 3rd Reconnaissance Battalion in Kroměříž
 2nd Engineer Battalion in Břeclav
 3rd Signal Battalion in Kroměříž
 3rd Supply Battalion in Kroměříž
 3rd Maintenance Battalion in Kroměříž
 13th Chemical Defence Battalion in Bzenec
 13th Medical Battalion
 4th Tank Division in Havlíčkův Brod
 7th Tank Regiment in Jindřichův Hradec
 8th Tank Regiment in Jihlava
 13th Tank Regiment in Čáslav
 9th Motor Rifle Regiment in Znojmo with BVP-1 tracked infantry fighting vehicles
 6th Artillery Regiment in Jemnice
 4th Separate Rocket Launcher Division in Jemčina with 9K52 Luna-M artillery rocket systems
 4th Command and Artillery Reconnaissance Battery in Havlíčkův Brod
 4th Anti-Aircraft Missile Regiment in Bzenec with 2K12 Kub surface-to-air missile systems
 4th Reconnaissance Battalion in Jindřichův Hradec
 6th Engineer Battalion in Jindřichův Hradec
 5th Signal Battalion in Havlíčkův Brod
 4th Supply Battalion in Havlíčkův Brod
 4th Maintenance Battalion in Jihlava
 6th Chemical Defence Battalion in Havlíčkův Brod
 6th Medical Battalion
 9th Tank Division in Tábor
 14th Tank Regiment in Písek
 17th Tank Regiment in Týn nad Vltavou
 18th Tank Regiment in Tábor
 79th Motor Rifle Regiment in Benešov with BVP-1 tracked infantry fighting vehicles
 362nd Artillery Regiment in Lešany
 9th Separate Rocket Launcher Division in Jistebnice with OTR-21 Tochka tactical ballistic missiles
 9th Command and Artillery Reconnaissance Battery in Jistebnice
 9th Anti-Aircraft Missile Regiment in Strakonice with 2K12 Kub surface-to-air missile systems
 9th Reconnaissance Battalion in Kašperské Hory
 8th Engineer Battalion in Týn nad Vltavou
 9th Signal Battalion in Tábor
 9th Supply Battalion in Písek
 9th Maintenance Battalion in Písek
 4th Chemical Defence Battalion in Vráž
 4th Medical Battalion
 15th Motor Rifle Division in České Budějovice (in case of full mobilization would have also formed the 18th Motor Rifle Division)
 20th Tank Regiment in České Budějovice
 51st Motor Rifle Regiment in Český Krumlov with OT-64 wheeled armored transports vehicles
 62nd Motor Rifle Regiment in Prachatice with BVP-1 tracked infantry fighting vehicles
 68th Motor Rifle Regiment in Vimperk with OT-64 wheeled armored transports vehicles
 36th Artillery Regiment in České Budějovice
 15th Separate Rocket Launcher Division in Vimperk with 9K52 Luna-M artillery rocket systems
 15th Command and Artillery Reconnaissance Battery in České Budějovice
 1st Anti-Aircraft Regiment in České Budějovice
 15th Reconnaissance Battalion in Vimperk
 15th Engineer Battalion in České Budějovice
 1st Signal Battalion in České Budějovice
 15th Supply Battalion in Kaplice
 15th Maintenance Battalion in České Budějovice
 1st Chemical Defence Battalion in České Budějovice
 1st Medical Battalion
 331st Heavy Artillery Brigade in Hranice
 31st Heavy Artillery Division with SS-1C Scud-B tactical ballistic missiles
 32nd Heavy Artillery Division with SS-1C Scud-B tactical ballistic missiles
 31st Artillery Base in Kostelec nad Orlicí servicing the missiles of the 331st Heavy Artillery Brigade
 332nd Cannon Artillery Brigade in Jičín
 Command and Artillery Reconnaissance Battery
 1st Cannon Artillery Division with 18x 130mm M1954 towed howitzers
 2nd Cannon Artillery Division with 18x 130mm M1954 towed howitzers
 3rd Cannon Artillery Division with 18x 152mm SpGH DANA self-propelled howitzers
 4th Cannon Artillery Division with 18x 152mm SpGH DANA self-propelled howitzers
 5th Cannon Artillery Division with 18x 152mm SpGH DANA self-propelled howitzers
 1st Engineer Brigade in Pardubice
 107th Engineer Battalion
 108th Engineer Battalion
 109th Engineer Battalion
 1st Engineer Roadblocking Battalion
 1st Engineer Transit Battalion
 4th Supply Brigade in Pacov
 41st Transport Battalion in Pacov
 42nd Transport Battalion in Pacov
 43rd Transport Battalion in Písek
 44th Transport Battalion in Kaplice
 45th Fuel Transport Battalion in Benešov
 97th Medical Evacuation Battalion in Pacov
 251st Anti-aircraft Missile Regiment in Kroměříž with 20x 2K12 Kub systems
 Headquarters Battery
 1st Firing Battery
 2nd Firing Battery
 3rd Firing Battery
 4th Firing Battery
 5th Firing Battery
 Technical Battery
 217th Anti-tank Regiment in Lešany
 1st Anti-tank Division with 12x 100mm vz. 53 anti-tank cannons and 6x BRDM-2 vehicles in the anti-tank variant with Konkurs anti-tank missiles
 2nd Anti-tank Division with 12x 100mm vz. 53 anti-tank cannons and 6x BRDM-2 vehicles in the anti-tank variant with Konkurs anti-tank missiles
 3rd Anti-tank Division with 12x 100mm vz. 53 anti-tank cannons and 6x BRDM-2 vehicles in the anti-tank variant with Konkurs anti-tank missiles
 72nd Pontoon Regiment in Kamýk nad Vltavou
 2nd Signal Regiment in Písek
 1st Signal Battalion
 2nd Signal Battalion 
 3rd Signal Battalion
 24th Long Distance Signal Communications Regiment in Písek
 4th Electronic Warfare Regiment in Český Krumlov 
 74th Special Purpose Electronic Intelligence Regiment in Horažďovice
 74th Radio Surveying HF Company
 74th Radio Surveying VHF Company
 74th Radio Surveying and Targeting Company
 74th Automatic Radio Surveying and Targeting Company
 74th Combat Support and Services Company
 5th Reconnaissance Artillery Division in Rychnov nad Kněžnou
 4th Radio-technical Battalion in Vimperk
 Light Radio-technical Company
 Heavy Radio-technical Company
 Signal Company
 105th Chemical Defence Battalion in Jaroměř
 14th Road Construction Battalion in Vimperk
 4th Radiation Center in Písek
 52nd Command and Reconnaissance Squadron in Havlíčkův Brod
 3rd Helicopter Detachment with 2x Mi-2 helicopters to support the 3rd Motor Rifle Division in wartime
 4th Helicopter Detachment with 2x Mi-2 helicopters to support the 4th Tank Division in wartime
 9th Helicopter Detachment with 2x Mi-2 helicopters to support the 9th Tank Division in wartime
 15th Helicopter Detachment with 2x Mi-2 helicopters to support the 15th Motor Rifle Division in wartime
 52nd Air Base and Electronic Support Company
 104th Unmanned Aerial Vehicle Reconnaissance Squadron in Strakonice with Tupolev Tu-143 VR-3 Rejs drones
 4th Signal and Radio-technical Services Company in Strakonice

References

External links
http://www.csla.cz/armada/druhyvojsk/csla2dislokace.htm
http://www.ww2.dk/new/wp/Czechoslovakia/4a.htm

Field armies
Military units and formations of Czechoslovakia
Military units and formations disestablished in 1991